L'Educatore Israelita, known as Il Vessillo Israelitico after 1874, was one of the first Jewish newspapers in Italy.

History
L'Educatore Israelita was founded by Giuseppe Levi in 1853, who published the newspaper in conjunction with Esdra Pontremoli. It advocated moderate Jewish reform, to be brought about by the co-operation of all communities. S. D. Luzzatto, Lelio Della Torre, Lelio Cantoni, Marco Mortara, and Elia Benamozegh were among its contributors. 

After Levi's death in 1874 the periodical was continued in Casale by  under the title Il Vessillo Israelitico ('The Israelite Banner'). During the early years of its existence under this title it contained essays from the pens of such men as Abraham Berliner, Pietro Perreau, Moses Soave, and Moritz Steinschneider; but later its importance as a literary and scientific journal deteriorated.

Flaminio Servi died in 1904, and was succeeded by his son Ferruccio.

References
 This article incorporates text from a publication now in the public domain: Singer, Isidore; et al., eds. (1901–1906). The Jewish Encyclopedia. New York: Funk & Wagnalls.

External links
 Digitized volumes of the Educatore Israelita at HathiTrust

1853 establishments in Italy
1921 disestablishments in Italy
Defunct newspapers published in Italy
Italian-language newspapers
Jewish newspapers